The Old Whim Horse is a poem by Australian writer and poet Edward Dyson. It was first published in The Bulletin magazine on 30 July 1892, and later in the poet's collection Rhymes from the Mines and Other Lines (1896).

Analysis
In a review of the poem in "The Sunday Mail" (Brisbane), the reviewer describes the poem as follows: "Day after day, week after week, this horse comes along to the whim to work his 'shift' but never can he understand why his friends and his master do not come to work also. Still he hopes and waits patiently for their return. His thoughts are always of them and of the days when they toiled together side by side. But time passes by him swiftly, and gradually, through sadness and his desire to be with his friends again, his reasoning mind drops back into oblivion, and he begins to live in the world of his imagination."

Geoffrey Blainey, in "Days of Gold", his essay on the 150th anniversary of Eureka: "Nearby, a few spectators are patting a whim-horse, a slightly obstinate Clydesdale, about seven years old. He stands beside the whim, where his task is to plod round and round, tugging the rope that lifts materials from the nearby shaft. A few of the older generation are delighted to see him, because in their childhood, Edward Dyson's The Old Whim Horse was one of the most popular poems in the land: He's an old, grey horse, with his head bowed sadly."

Geoffrey Blainey, in his A History of Victoria (2006), stated that Dyson's poem "continued to remind thousands of young Victorians of the faithfulness of the horse in an era when the well-being of every Victorian depended on horsepower."

Note
 A "whim" is "a horse-drawn winch formerly used in mining to lift ore or water".

Further publications
 An Anthology of Australian Verse edited by Bertram Stevens (1907)
 The Golden Treasury of Australian Verse edited by Bertram Stevens (1909)
 Favourite Australian Poems edited by Ian Mudie (1963)
 This Land : An Anthology of Australian Poetry for Young People edited by M. M. Flynn and J. Groom (1968)
 The Collins Book of Australian Poetry edited by Rodney Hall (1981)
 The Illustrated Treasury of Australian Verse edited by Beatrice Davis (1984)
 A Collection of Australian Bush Verse edited by Peter Antill-Rose (1989) 
 Classic Australian Verse edited by Maggie Pinkney (2001)
 Two Centuries of Australian Poetry edited by Kathrine Bell (2007)
 100 Australian Poems You Need to Know edited by Jamie Grant (2008)

See also
 1892 in poetry
 1892 in literature
 1892 in Australian literature
 Australian literature

References 

Australian poems
1892 poems
Works originally published in The Bulletin (Australian periodical)